Sparganium erectum, the simplestem bur-reed or branched bur-reed, is a perennial plant species in the genus Sparganium.

The larvae of the moth Plusia festucae feed on Sparganium erectum.

Subspecies:
 Sparganium erectum subsp. microcarpum (Neuman) Domin (synonym: Sparganium microcarpum (Neuman) Celak.)

References

External links

erectum
Flora of Europe
Flora of North Africa
Flora of temperate Asia
Plants described in 1753
Taxa named by Carl Linnaeus